List of Gulf War Military Equipment is a summary of the various military weapons and vehicles used by the different nations during the Gulf War of 1990–1991.

Coalition

United States Army & Marine Corps

Gas Mask
 M17 gas mask

Military Camouflage Pattern
 Desert Battle Dress Uniform
 Desert Camouflage Uniform
 Desert Night Camouflage
 Disruptive Pattern Material
 Camouflage Daguet
 Tigerstripe

Infantry weapons
 M14 Rifle
 M1 Garand
 M1 Carbine
 M16A1
 M16A2
 CAR-15
 L85A1 assault rifle
 M60 machine gun
 M61 Vulcan
 M3 submachine gun
 FN Minimi
 M2 Browning
 Heckler & Koch MP5
 M1919 Browning machine gun
 M249
 M240
 M134 Minigun
 M9 pistol
 FÉG PA-63
 Walther PP/PPK
 P226 pistol
 M1911 pistol
 Barrett M82
 McMillan M87
 M24 Sniper Weapon System
 M21 Sniper Weapon System
 M40 Sniper Rifle
 FR F1
 M870 Shotgun
 M2HB
 TOW missile
 M72 LAW
 M136 AT4
 M47 Dragon
 Daewoo K1
 Daewoo K2
 Daewoo K3 
 AT4
 Carl Gustaf 8.4 cm recoilless rifle
 M203
 Mk 19
 M18 Claymore mine
 M67 grenade
 Ka-Bar
 M9 bayonet
 M7 bayonet

Main battle tanks
 M1A1 Abrams
 M1A1 HA Abrams Heavy Armor
 M60A1 Patton RISE Passive  (USMC)
 M60A3 Patton TTS (US Army)
 M551 Sheridan (US Army)

Armoured fighting  vehicles
 M2A2 Bradley IFV (Infantry Fighting Vehicle)
 M3A2 Bradley CFV (Cavalry Fighting Vehicle)
 M551A1 Sheridan  Armored Reconnaissance Airborne Assault Vehicle
 AAVP7A1 Assault Amphibious Vehicle Personnel (USMC)
 LAV-25 Light Armored Vehicle (USMC)
 LAV-AT Light Armored Vehicle (Anti-Tank) (USMC)
 M113A2/A3 (armored personnel carrier)
 M93 Fox NBC Reconnaissance System (UOR acquisition from Germany)
 M901A1 Improved TOW Vehicle

Self-propelled artillery/mortars/rockets/missiles
 LAV-M Light Armored Vehicle (Mortar) (USMC)
 M106A2 self-propelled mortar carrier
 M109A2/A3/A4 155 mm self-propelled howitzer
 M110A2 8 inch self-propelled howitzer
 M270 Multiple Launch Rocket System
 MGM-140 ATACMS
 GCT 155mm

Anti-aircraft
 M163 VADS Vulcan Air Defence System
 M48 Chaparral Self-Propelled SAM (Surface-To-Air Missile) Launcher
 M1097 Avenger Humvee
 M167 VADS Vulcan Air Defence System
 MIM-23 Improved Hawk SAM launcher
 FIM-92 Stinger Man-Portable Surface to Air Missile System
 MIM-104 Patriot SAM launcher
 LAV-AD Light Armored Vehicle (Air Defense) (USMC)

Artillery and mortars
 M102 105 mm towed howitzer
 M198 155 mm towed howitzer
 M58 MICLIC (Mine Clearing Line Charge) Towed
 M224 60 mm Light Weight Mortar
 M252 81 mm Medium Weight Mortar
 M30 107 mm Heavy Weight Mortar

Engineering and recovery vehicles
 M728 Combat Engineer Vehicle
 M9 Armored Combat Earthmover
 M60 AVLM (Armored Vehicle Launched MICLIC (Mine-Clearing Line Charge))
 M88A1 Armoured Recovery Vehicle
 M60A1 Armored Vehicle Launched Bridge
 M578 Light Recovery Vehicle (Armoured Recovery Vehicle)
 D7 Caterpillar Armored Bulldozer
 M139 Volcano Mine System

Command vehicles
 M577A2 ACP (Armored Command Post) Carrier
 AACV7A1 (Assault Amphibian Vehicle Command) (USMC)
 LAV-25C2 Light Armored Vehicle (Command & Control) (USMC)
 M981 FISTV (Fire Support Team Vehicle)

Other vehicles
 M998 HMMWV Humvee
 M151A2 FAV (Fast Attack Vehicle) (USMC)
 M1008 CUCV (Commercial Utility, Cargo Vehicle)
 FAV (Fast Attack Vehicle) / DPV (Desert Patrol Vehicle)
 Kawasaki KLR-250-D8
 M35A2 6×6 2.5-Ton Truck "Deuce And A Half"
 M915 6×4 Army truck medium transportation.
 M915A1 6×4 Army truck medium transportation.
 M925A1 6×6 5-Ton Truck
 M548 Tracked Cargo Carrier
 M992 FAASV (Field Artillery Ammunition Supply Vehicle)
 M1059 Smoke Generator Carrier
 1990 Mitsubishi Pajero V6 3.0 4WD (High Military Positions Transport Vehicle)

Aircraft

Helicopters
 Bell AH-1F Cobra (Army)
 Bell AH-1J SeaCobra (USMC)
 Bell AH-1T Improved SeaCobra (USMC)
 Bell AH-1W SuperCobra (United States Marine Corps)
 Boeing AH-64A Apache (Army)
 Boeing CH-46D Sea Knight (USN)
 Boeing CH-46E Sea Knight (USMC)
 Boeing CH-47D Chinook (Army)
 Sikorsky CH-53D Sea Stallion (USN, USMC)
 Sikorsky CH-53E Super Stallion (USMC)
 Bell EH-1H Iroquois (Huey) (Army)
 Sikorsky EH-60A Quick Fix (Army)
 Boeing HH-46D Sea Knight (USN)
 Sikorsky HH-60H Seahawk (USN)
 Boeing MH-47 (SOA) Special Operations Aircraft (Army)
 Sikorsky MH-53E Sea Dragon (USN)
 Sikorsky MH-60G Pave Hawk (USAF)
 Bell OH-58A Kiowa (Army)
 Bell OH-58C Kiowa (Army)
 Bell OH-58D Kiowa (Army)
 Sikorsky RH-53D Sea Stallion (USMC)
 Kaman SH-2F Seasprite (USN)
 Sikorsky SH-3G Sea King (USN)
 Sikorsky SH-3H Sea King (USN)
 Sikorsky SH-60B Seahawk (USN)
 Bell UH-1H Iroquois (Huey) (Army)
 Bell UH-1N (Huey) (USMC)
 Bell UH-1V Iroquois (Huey) Aeromedical Evacuation (Army)
 Boeing UH-46D Sea Knight (USN)
 Sikorsky UH-60A Black Hawk (Army)

Airplanes
 Grumman A-6E TRAM Intruder (USN, USMC)
Grumman A-6E SWIP Intruder (USN)
 Grumman OV1D Mohawk (Army)
 LTV A-7E Corsair II (USN)
 BAe/McDonnell Douglas AV-8B Harrier II (USMC)
 A-10A Thunderbolt II (Warthog) (USAF)
 Lockheed AC-130A (Spectre) Gunship (USAF)
 Lockheed AC-130H (Spectre) Gunship (USAF)
 Boeing B-52G Stratofortress (USAF)
 Boeing B-52H Stratofortress (USAF)
 Grumman C-2A Greyhound (USN)
 Lockheed C-141 Starlifter (USAF)
 Lockheed C-5 Galaxy (USAF)
 McDonnell Douglas C-9B Skytrain II (USN)
 Raytheon C-12 Huron (USAF)
 Lockheed C-130 Hercules (USAF)
 Lockheed C-130F Hercules (USN)
 North American Rockwell CT-39G (USN)
 McDonnell Douglas DC-9 (USN)
 Grumman E-2C Hawkeye (USN)
 Boeing E-3B Sentry AWACS Airborne Warning And Control System (USAF)
 Douglas EA-3B Skywarrior (USN)
 Lockheed EP-3E Aries II (USN)
 Grumman EA-6B Prowler (USN)
 Boeing E-8 Joint STARS Joint Surveillance Target Attack Radar System (USAF)
 General Dynamics EF-111A Raven (USAF)
 Lockheed EC-130E/J Commando Solo (USAF)
 Lockheed EC-130H Compass Call (USAF)
 Boeing EC-135L Looking Glass (USAF)
 McDonnell Douglas RF-4C Phantom II (USAF)
 McDonnell Douglas F-4G Phantom II (Wild Weasel) (USAF)
 Grumman F-14A Tomcat (USN)
 Grumman F-14A+(B) Tomcat (USN)
 McDonnell Douglas F-15C Eagle (USAF)
 McDonnell Douglas F-15E Strike Eagle (USAF)
 General Dynamics F-16A Fighting Falcon (USAF)
 General Dynamics F-16C Fighting Falcon (USAF)
 McDonnell Douglas F/A-18A Hornet (USN, USMC)
 McDonnell Douglas F/A-18C Hornet (USN, USMC)
 McDonnell Douglas F/A-18D Hornet (USMC)
 General Dynamics F-111E Aardvark (USAF)
 General Dynamics F-111F Aardvark (USAF)
 Lockheed F-117A Nighthawk (USAF)
 Lockheed HC-130 King (USAF)
 McDonnell Douglas KC-10A Extender (USAF)
 Lockheed KC-130F Hercules (USN, USMC)
 Lockheed KC-130R Hercules (USMC)
 Lockheed KC-130T Hercules (USMC)
 Boeing KC-135E Stratotanker (USAF)
 Boeing KC-135R Stratotanker (USAF)
 Lockheed MC-130E Hercules Combat Talon (USAF)
 North American Rockwell OV-10A Bronco (USMC)
 North American Rockwell OV-10D Bronco (USMC)
 North American Rockwell OV-10D+ Bronco (USMC)
 Lockheed P-3B Orion (USN)
 Lockheed P-3C Orion (USN)
 Boeing RC-135V/W Rivet Joint (USAF)
 McDonnell Douglas RF-4C Phantom II (USAF)
 Lockheed S-3A Viking (USN)
 Lockheed S-3B Viking (USN)
 Lockheed U-2/TR-1 Dragon Lady (USAF)
 Lockheed UP-3A Orion (USN)

Unmanned Aerial Vehicles Drones
 Northrop BQM-74 Chukar (USAF)
 AAI RQ-2 Pioneer (USN, USMC, US Army)

Spacecraft
 Defense Support Program
 Defense Satellite Communications System
 Defense Meteorological Satellite Program
 GPS satellite blocks
 Small Lightweight GPS Receiver
 DMSP Rapid Deployment Imaging Terminal

Ships
Command Ships
 

Aircraft carriers
 
 
 
 

Battleships
 

Submarines
 

Amphibious assault ships
 
 

Guided missile cruisers
 
 
 
 
 

Destroyer tenders
 
 

Destroyers
 

Guided missile destroyers
 
 

Frigates
 
 

Amphibious transport docks
 
 
 
 

Ammunition ships
 
 

Dock landing ships
 
 

Tank landing ships
 

Fast sealift ships
 

Fleet oilers
 
 
 

Combat stores ships
 
 

Fast combat support ships
 

Replenishment oiler ships
 

Minesweepers
 

Repair ships
 

Rescue and salvage ships
 

Sealift ships
 

Hospital ships
 

Amphibious cargo ships
 

Mine countermeasure ships
 

Survey ships
 

Light water craft
 LCU-1610 (Landing Craft Utility)
 LCAC (Landing Craft Air Cushion)

United Kingdom

Land-based
Military camouflage pattern
 Disruptive Pattern Material

Infantry weapons
 L85A1
 L1A1 Self-Loading Rifle
 Diemaco C7
 L2A3 submachine gun
 L9A1 pistol
 L96A1
 L7A1 machine gun
 L1A2 LAW 80

Tanks
 FV4030/4 Challenger main battle tank
 FV4003 Centurion Mk.5 AVRE 165 (Armoured Vehicle Royal Engineers)

Armoured vehicles
 FV101 Scorpion armoured reconnaissance vehicle
 FV102 Striker  anti-tank guided missile carrier
 FV103 Spartan armoured personnel carrier
 FV104 Samaritan armoured ambulance
 FV107 Scimitar armoured reconnaissance vehicle
 FV432 armoured personnel carrier
 FV432  armoured ambulance
 FV510 Warrior infantry fighting vehicle
 Ferret armoured car
 TPz Fuchs NBC and EW variants (UOR acquisition from Germany)

Self-propelled artillery/mortars/rockets
 FV432(M) Trojan self-propelled mortar carrier
 M109 155 mm self-propelled howitzer
 M110 8 inch self-propelled howitzer
 M270 Multiple Launch Rocket System

Anti-aircraft
 Rapier Field Standard B1(M) Stationary SAM launcher
 Rapier Field Standard B2 Stationary Surface-To-Air Missile Launcher
 Tracked Rapier mobile SAM launcher
 Javelin Lightweight Multiple Launcher surface-to-air missile launcher

Artillery and Mortars
 L118 105 mm Light Gun
 51 mm Light Mortar
 L16A1 81 mm Mortar

Engineering and recovery vehicles
 FV4205 Chieftain AVLB - armoured vehicle launched bridge
 FV180 Combat Engineer Tractor
 FV106 Samson armoured recovery vehicle (ARV)
 FV434 ARV 
 FV512 Warrior Mechanised Combat Repair Vehicle
 FV513 Warrior Mechanised Recovery Vehicle (Repair)
 Chieftain Armoured Repair and Recovery Vehicle (CHARRV)

Command vehicles
 FV105 Sultan

Other vehicles
 Land Rover Defender
 Land Rover Series III 109"
 Leyland 4×4 4-Tonne Lorry
 Bedford 4×4 8-Tonne Lorry
 Mercedes Unimog Support Vehicle
 FV620 Stalwart Amphibious Truck
 Harley Davidson MT350E
 Scammell Commander (TK/TPTR) Tank Transporter
 Scammell Crusader (AVLB) Bridge Transporter
 Scammell S26 Self Loading Dump Truck
 Armstrong 500
 Leyland DROPs (Demountable Rack Off Pickup System)
 M548 Tracked Cargo Carrier

Aircraft

Rotary-wing
 Aérospatiale-Westland Gazelle AH.1 (AAC)
 Westland Lynx AH.1 (AAC)
 Westland Lynx AH.7 (AAC)
 Westland Lynx HAS.3 (RN)
 Boeing Chinook HC.1B (RAF)
 Westland Sea King HC.4/HAS.5 (RN)
 Westland Puma HC.1 (RAF)

Fixed-wing
 Panavia Tornado GR.1 (RAF) IDS (Interdictor/Strike)
 SEPECAT Jaguar GR.1A (RAF)
 Panavia Tornado F.3 (RAF) ADV (Air Defence Variant)
 Blackburn Buccaneer S.2B (RAF)
 BAe Nimrod MR.2P (RAF)
 BAe Nimrod R.1 (RAF)
 Britten-Norman Islander AL.1 (RAF)
 Handley Page Victor K.2 (RAF)
 Lockheed Tristar (RAF)
 Lockheed Hercules C.1 (RAF)
 Lockheed Hercules C.3 (RAF)
 Vickers VC10 C.1 (RAF)
 Vickers VC10 K.2 (RAF)
 Vickers VC10 K.3 (RAF)
 M.D.FGR-2 Phantom (92/19 Sqns RAFG)

Ships
Aircraft carrier
 

Frigates
 
 Broadsword class

Destroyers
 Type 42 destroyer

Support ships
 

Submarines
 

Fleet support tankers
 

Fast fleet tankers
 
 

Stores ships
 
 RFA Fort Grange

Landing Ship Logistics
 
 
 
 

Mine countermeasure vessels
 

Primary casualty reception vessels
 

Fleet repair ships

Kuwait/Free Kuwait

Land-based
Infantry weapons
 M16A1
 M16A2
 FN FAL
 MP5A3
 MP5K
Tanks
 Chieftain tank MBT (Main Battle Tank)
 M-84AB MBT (Main Battle Tank)

Armoured vehicles
 BMP-2 IFV (Infantry Fighting Vehicle)
 M113A1 APC (Armored Personnel Carrier)
 FV601 Saladin (Armoured Car)

Aircraft
Helicopters
 Aérospatiale SA.342 Gazelle

Airplanes
 Dassault Mirage F1CK (KAF)
 McDonnell Douglas A-4KU Skyhawk (KAF)

France

Land-based
Infantry weapons
 FAMAS
 Heckler & Koch MP5
 M16A2
 AA-52
 FR F1
 PAMAS-G1
 MAC Mle 1950

Tanks
 AMX-30B2 MBT (Main Battle Tank)

Armoured vehicles
 AMX-10RC Armoured Car
 AMX-10P Infantry Fighting Vehicle 
 Panhard AML-90 Armoured Car
 Panhard ERC-90F4 Sagaie Armoured Car
 VAB (Véhicule de l'Avant Blindé)
 VAB-VCAC/HOT (Véhicule de l'Avant Blindé) ATGM (Anti-Tank Guided Missile) Launching Vehicle
 VAB-VTM (Véhicule de l'Avant Blindé) Mortar Tractor

Artillery and mortars
 TRF1 155 mm Towed Howitzer
 MO-81-61C 81 mm Mortar
 MO-120-RT-61 120 mm Mortar

Command vehicles
 VAB-PC (Véhicule de l'Avant Blindé) (Command)

Anti-aircraft
 GIAT 20 mm 53T2 Towed AAA (Anti-Aircraft Artillery)
 Mistral SAM (Surface-To-Air Missile) Launcher

Other vehicles
 Peugeot P4 4WD car
 ACMAT VLRA (Véhicule Léger de Reconnaissance et d’Appui) 4WD truck

Aircraft
Helicopters
 Aérospatiale SA-342 Gazelle
 Aérospatiale SA-330 Puma
 Aérospatiale Super Frelon

Airplanes
 Dassault Mirage F1C-200 (AdA)
 Dassault Mirage 2000 (AdA)
 SEPECAT Jaguar A (AdA)
 Dassault Super Étendard

Ships
Aircraft carriers

Qatar

Land-based
Infantry weapons
 FN FAL
Tanks
 AMX-30S MBT (Main Battle Tank)
Armoured vehicles
 GIAT VAB (Véhicule de l'Avant Blindé)
 GIAT VAB-VCAC/HOT (Véhicule de l'Avant Blindé) ATGM (Anti-Tank Guided Missile) Launching Vehicle

Aircraft
 Dassault Mirage F1EDA

Saudi Arabia

Land-based
Military Camouflage Pattern
 Desert Battle Dress Uniform

Infantry weapons
 Browning Hi-Power
 Steyr MPi 69
 MP5A3
 Heckler & Koch G3
 Steyr AUG
 M16A2
 M67 recoilless rifle
Tank
 AMX-30S MBT (Main Battle Tank)
 M60A3 TTS MBT (Main Battle Tank)
Armoured vehicles
 M113A1 APC (Armored Personnel Carrier)
 V-150
 VCC-1 TOW
Anti-aircraft
 M163 VADS Vulcan Air Defence System
Engineering and recovery vehicles
 M728 CEV (Combat Engineer Vehicle)
Other vehicles
 M151 Truck, Utility, 1/4-Ton, 4×4
 M35 series 2½-ton 6×6 cargo truck
Self-propelled artillery/mortars/rockets
 M109A2 155 mm SPH (Self-Propelled Howitzer)
 AMX-GCT 155 mm SPH (Self-Propelled Howitzer)
 Astros II MLRS
Artillery and mortars
 M252 81 mm Medium Weight Mortar

Aircraft
Helicopters
 UH-60
Airplanes
 Tornado F3
 McDonnell Douglas F-15 Eagle

Ships

Egypt

Land-based
Infantry weapons
 AK-47
 Helwan
 Maadi
 Carl Gustav M45
 FN MAG
 PKM
 RPG-7
Tank
 M60A3 TTS MBT (Main Battle Tank)
Armoured vehicles
 M113A2 APC (Armored Personnel Carrier)
Anti-aircraft
 ZSU-23-4 Shilka (Self-Propelled Anti-Aircraft Artillery)
Engineering and recovery vehicles
 M88A1 recovery vehicle
Other vehicles
 Jeep YJ
 M151 Truck, Utility, 1/4-Ton, 4×4
Self-propelled artillery/mortars/rockets
 M109A2 155 mm SPH (Self-Propelled Howitzer)

Italy
Infantry weapons
 Beretta BM 59
 Beretta AR70/90
 Beretta 92
 Beretta M12
 Benelli M3 Super 90
 Heckler & Koch G3
 Sako TRG
 FN Minimi

Aircraft
 8 Panavia Tornado IDS Interdictor/Strike

Ships
 1  (Audace)
 3 s (Orsa, Lupo, Sagittario)
 2 s (Zeffiro, Libeccio)
 1  (San Marco)
 2  (Vesuvio, Stromboli)

Canada

Infantry weapons
 Browning Hi Power (Made locally as Inglis Hi Power)
 Colt Canada C7
C8SFW
 C3A1
 Heckler & Koch MP5
 FN MAG (FN C6 MAG)
 M2 Browning

Ships

Bahrain

Land-based
Infantry weapons
 Browning Hi-Power
 FN FAL
Tank
 M60A3 TTS MBT (Main Battle Tank)
Other vehicles
 Mercedes-Benz NG

Belgium

Infantry weapons
 Browning Hi Power
 FN FNC
 FN FAL
 FN MAG
 FN Minimi

Sweden

Infantry weapons
 Pist 88
 Ak 4
 Ak 5
 Ksp 58
 Heckler & Koch PSG-1

Syria
Infantry weapons
 Browning Hi-Power
 Makarov PM
 Tokarev TT-33
 AK-47
 AKM
 AK-74
 MPi-KM
 Type 56 assault rifle
 PKM
 RPD
 SVD Dragunov
 RPG-7
Tank
 T-62 MBT (Main Battle Tank)
Other vehicles
 TAM 150 T11 B/BV

Iraq

Iraq
List of substantial numbers of various military equipment in Iraq's possession from around 1970 onwards. (Not a guarantee that all were used in combat or in theatre during the war.)

Land-based
Infantry weapons
 AK-47
 AKS-47
 AKM
 AK-63
 AK-74
 AKS-74U
 PM md. 63
 MPi-KM
 Type 81
 vz.58
 FN FAL
 Zastava M70
 Zastava M76
 Tabuk Sniper Rifle
 Heckler & Koch MP5 
 Sterling 
 PPSh-41
 PPS-43 
 Type 56 assault rifle
 PM-63 RAK
 PM-84
 vz.61 Skorpion 
 Type 69 RPG
 RPG-7
 M136 AT4
 PK machine gun
 FN MAG
 MG 3
 MG 42
 PKT
 RPK
 RPD
 Zastava M72
 Type 67
 Zastava M70B1
 Zastava M80
 Dragunov sniper rifle
 Steyr SSG 69
 PSL (rifle)
 SKS
 NSV machine gun
 DShK
 KPV
 Type 80
 Zastava M84
 SG-43 Goryunov
 DSHKM
 TT pistol
 CZ-75
 CZ-82
 Tariq
 Browning Hi-Power
 Beretta Model 1951
 Makarov pistol
 FEG PA-63 
 Mauser Karabiner 98k
 Lee-Enfield 
 Mosin-Nagant M1891 
 M1917 Enfield 
 Automatgevär m/42
Tanks
 T-72M/M1 MBT (Main Battle Tank)
 T-72 Ural MBT (Main Battle Tank)
 Asad Babil MBT (Main Battle Tank)
 T-62 MBT (Main Battle Tank)
 T-55A MBT (Main Battle Tank)
 T-55 MBT (Main Battle Tank)
 T-54 MBT (Main Battle Tank)
 T-55 Enigma MBT (Main Battle Tank)
 T-55QM MBT (Main Battle Tank)
 T-55QM2 MBT (Main Battle Tank)
 Type 59 MBT (Main Battle Tank)
 Type 69-II MBT (Main Battle Tank)
 Type 69-QM MBT (Main Battle Tank)
 Type 69-QM2 MBT (Main Battle Tank)
 TR 800 MBT (Main Battle Tank)
 PT-76 Amphibious Tank
 

Armoured vehicles
 BMP-1 IFV (Infantry Fighting Vehicle)
 BMP-2 IFV (Infantry Fighting Vehicle)
 AMX-10P IFV (Infantry Fighting Vehicle)
 Panhard AML-60 Armoured Car
 Panhard AML-90 Armoured Car
 Engesa EE-9 Cascavel Armoured Car
 Engesa EE-3 Jararaca Reconnaissance Vehicle
 BRDM-2 (Reconnaissance Vehicle)
 Panhard M3 (Armored Personnel Carrier)
 Engesa EE-11 Urutu APC (Armored Personnel Carrier)
 YW351 APC (Armored Personnel Carrier)
 OT-62C APC (Armored Personnel Carrier)
 OT-64C SKOT-2A APC (Armored Personnel Carrier)
 Walid (armored personnel carrier) (Armored Personnel Carrier)
 PSZH D-944 APC (Armored Personnel Carrier)
 MT-LB APC (Armored Personnel Carrier)
 Mowag Roland APC (Armored Personnel Carrier)
 BTR-50P APC (Armored Personnel Carrier)
 BTR-60PB APC (Armored Personnel Carrier)
 BTR-80 APC (Armored Personnel Carrier)
 OT M-60P APC (Armored Personnel Carrier)
 Panhard VCR-TH ATGM (Anti-Tank Guided Missile) Launcher Vehicle
 BRDM-2 9P133 ATGM (Anti-Tank Guided Missile) Launcher Vehicle

Self-Propelled Artillery/Mortars/Rockets/Missiles
 2S1 Gvozdika 122 mm SPH (Self-Propelled Howitzer)
 2S3 Akatsiya 152 mm SPH (Self-Propelled Howitzer)
 AMX-GCT 155 mm SPH (Self-Propelled Howitzer)
 M109A1 155 mm SPH (Self-Propelled Howitzer)
 ASTROS II MLRS (Multiple Launch Rocket System)
 RL-21 122 mm (Multiple Rocket Launcher)
 BM-21 Grad 122 mm MRL (Multiple Rocket Launcher)
 FROG-7 Luna-M TEL (Transporter/Erector/Launcher)
 9P117/SS-1c Scud-B TEL (Transporter/Erector/Launcher)

Anti-aircraft
 ZSU-57-2 SPAAA (Self-Propelled Anti-Aircraft Artillery)
 ZSU-23-4 Shilka SPAAA (Self-Propelled Anti-Aircraft Artillery)
 NIIP\Vympel 2K12 "Kub" SA-6a Gainful Self-Propelled SAM (Surface-To-Air Missile) Launcher
 Antey 9K33M Osa-AK SA-8b Gecko Self-Propelled SAM (Surface-To-Air Missile) Launcher
 Nudelman 9K31 "Strela-1" SA-9 Gaskin Self-Propelled SAM (Surface-To-Air Missile) Launcher
 ZRK-BD 9K35 "Strela-10" SA-13 Gopher Self-Propelled SAM (Surface-To-Air Missile) Launcher
 AMX-30 Roland 2 Self-Propelled SAM (Surface-To-Air Missile) Launcher
 Lavochkin OKB S-75 Dvina SA-2 Guideline SAM (Surface-To-Air Missile) Launcher
 Isayev S-125M "Neva-M" SA-3b Goa SAM (Surface-To-Air Missile) Launcher
 Roland 2 SAM (Surface-To-Air Missile) Launcher
 ZPU-1 14.5 mm Towed AAA (Anti-Aircraft Artillery)
 ZPU-2 14.5 mm Towed AAA (Anti-Aircraft Artillery)
 ZPU-4 14.5 mm Towed AAA (Anti-Aircraft Artillery)
 ZU-23-2 23 mm Towed AAA (Anti-Aircraft Artillery)
 M1939 37 mm Towed AAA (Anti-Aircraft Artillery)
 S-60 57 mm Towed AAA (Anti-Aircraft Artillery)
 S-60 Twin 57 mm Towed AAA (Anti-Aircraft Artillery)
 KS-19 100 mm Towed AAA (Anti-Aircraft Artillery)

Artillery/mortars/rockets
 T-12 100 mm Anti-Tank Gun
 Type 63 107 mm MRL (Multiple Rocket Launcher)
 D-30 122 mm Towed Howitzer
 130 mm towed field gun M1954 (M-46)
 152 mm towed gun-howitzer M1955 (D-20)
 2A36 152 mm Towed Howitzer
 Type 83 152 mm Towed Howitzer
 GHN-45 155 mm Towed Howitzer
 M-46 155 mm Towed Howitzer
 G5 155 mm Towed Howitzer
 Al-Jaleel 82 mm Mortar
 Al-Jaleel 120 mm Mortar
 M43 160 mm Mortar
 M240 240 mm Mortar

Engineering and recovery vehicles
 Type 653 ARV (Armoured Recovery Vehicle)
 FV4024 Chieftain ARV (Armoured Recovery Vehicle)

Command vehicles
 Type 63 YW-701 CP (Command Post)
 BTR-50PU Command Vehicle
 BTR-60PU Command Vehicle

Other vehicles
 Mercedes-Benz Unimog
 GAZ-66
 KrAZ-255
 Ural-375D
 Ural-4320
 DAC-665T
 IFA W50
 ZIL-130
 ZIL-131
 Land Rover Series
 UAZ-469
 Ural M-61 Motorcycle

Aircraft
Helicopters
 Aérospatiale SA-316B Alouette III
 Aérospatiale SA-321H Super Frelon
 Aérospatiale SA-330 Puma
 Aérospatiale SA-342K Gazelle
 Bell 214ST
 Bölkow Bo-105C
 Bölkow Bo-105L
 Hughes 300C
 Hughes MD-500MD Defender
 Hughes MD-530F
 MBB/Kawasaki BK-117
 Mil Mi-1 Hare
 Mil Mi-4A Hound-A
 Mil Mi-6T Hook-A
 Mil Mi-8T Hip-C
 Mil Mi-8TV Hip-F
 Mil Mi-17 Hip-H
 Mil Mi-25 Hind-D

Airplanes
 Antonov An-12 Cub-A
 Antonov An-2 Colt
 Antonov An-24 Coke 
 Antonov An-26 Curl-A
 Antonov An-32 Cline
 Aero L-29C "Delfín" Maya
 Aero L-39C Albatros 
 Aero L-39ZO Albatros 
 Chengdu F-7A Fishcan
 Britten Norman BN-2 Islander
 Dassault Falcon 50
 Dassault Mirage F1EQ
 Dassault-Breguet Super Étendard 
 de Havilland Canada DHC-1 Chipmunk 
 de Havilland DH.100 Vampire FB.52 
 de Havilland DH.112 Venom FB.50 
 Hawker Hunter F.6 
 Iljushin Il-28 Beagle
 Ilyushin Il-76M Candid-B
 Mikoyan-Gurevich MiG-15bis Fagot
 Mikoyan-Gurevich MiG-17F Fresco-C
 Mikoyan-Gurevich MiG-17PF Fresco-D 
 Mikoyan-Gurevich MiG-19S Farmer-C 
 Mikoyan-Gurevich MiG-21MF Fishbed-J
 Mikoyan-Gurevich MiG-21bis Fishbed-N
 Mikoyan-Gurevich MiG-23BN Flogger-H
 Mikoyan-Gurevich MiG-23MF Flogger-B
 Mikoyan-Gurevich MiG-23MS Flogger-E
 Mikoyan-Gurevich MiG-25P Foxbat-A
 Mikoyan-Gurevich MiG-25RB Foxbat-B
 Mikoyan MiG-29B Fulcrum-A
 North American F-86F Sabre
 Shenyang F-6A Farmer
 Sukhoi Su-7B Fitter-A
 Sukhoi Su-20 Fitter
 Sukhoi Su-22UM-3K Fitter-G
 Sukhoi Su-22M-4 Fitter-K
 Sukhoi Su-24MK Fencer-D
 Sukhoi Su-25K Frogfoot-A
 Tupolev Tu-22K Blinder
 Xian H-6D Badger 
 Yakovlev Yak-18 Max

Ships
Landing ships
 Type 773 Polnocny Class

Fast attack ships
 TNC-45
 Osa class

Minelayers
 Type 43 Class

Patrol boats
 Zhuk Class

See also
 Operation Granby order of battle (UK)

References

Citations

Bibliography
 

1990s-related lists
Lists of military equipment
Military equipment
Gulf War